The 2017 São Tomé (Island or Regional) Second Division was a third their competition that took place that season.  The club had 10 clubs, the competition began on 21 May and finished on 13 November. Geographically almost all clubs but Ribeira Peixe and Guadalupe were from the Northeast. Sporting São Tomé won the title and will participate into the Premier Division in the following season, alongside second placed 6 de Setembro. A total of 90 matches were played and 338 goals were scored, higher than the previous two seasons season.w

On the opposites, both Kě Morabeza and Boavista Uba Budo were relegated into the Third Division in the following season as they were the last placed clubs.

Next season, Ototó and Cruz Vermelha were promoted into the Second Division as they were the top Third Division clubs of the season.

Overview
Sporting São Tomé scored the most goals numbering 71, a high unseen in the Second Division in seasons, second was 6 de Setembro with 42, third was Guadalupe with 37 and fourth was Santana with 34.  Kě Morabeza scored the least with only 13 goals. On the opposites, Boavista Uba Budo conceded the most with 58, second was 8th placed Oque do Rei with 37 and third was 7th placed Amador with 36.

Teams

Division table

References

Football competitions in São Tomé and Príncipe
Sao Tome
Sao Tome Second Division